Periano Ghundai, meaning "Hill of Fairies", was an archaeological mound located in the Zhob District in Balochistan, Pakistan.

It is located along the Zhob River, which forms a part of the Indus River Basin.

Archaeology 
Periano Ghundai was settled as early as 4300 BC, along with several other similar sites in Baluchistan.

"The number of settlements known in Baluchistan and in the adjacent lowlands had greatly increased by around 4300 BC, and they included important settlements such as Periano Ghundai (in the Zhob Valley), Mundigak (in the Kandahar region), Faiz Mohammad (in the Quetta Valley), Togau (in the Sarawan region), and Sheri Khan Tarakai (in the Bannu Basin)."

These developments were taking place during Mehrgarh period III.

Togau phase 

In a later period, Periano Ghundai belongs to the Togau phase in Baluchistan. Togau ware is dated 3500-3000 BC. It was first defined by Beatrice de Cardi in 1948. Togau is a large mound in the Chhappar Valley of Sarawan, 12 kilometer northwest of Kalat in Baluchistan.

Togau is a fine black-painted pottery, which originated in southern Afghanistan (Mundigak region) and eastern Balochistan (Kachi-Bolan region). Later it spread to central/southern Balochistan (Surab, Jhalawan, and Makran regions) and the Indus valley (Amri).

According to Jarrige et al (2011), four stages have been defined in the evolution of the Togau pottery, as attested during the Mehrgarh Period III. This tradition started to develop in the 5th millennium BC, and continued up to mid-4th millennium (3500 BC).

Togau and Kili Ghul Mohammad wares are closely related. Traditionally they are considered as the first painted pottery styles in Balochistan.

Ceramics 
Periano Ghundai painted ware is distinguished by black-on-red slip decorations. Geometric motifs predominate and are similar to those on Faiz Muhammad and Quetta ware potteries of the Damb Sadat Phase. Thus, there seem to be cultural connections between Periano Ghundai and Damb Sadat Phases.

Although similar, Faiz Muhammad painted ware is characterized by black-on-grey slip decorations.

Periano Ghundai site was completely destroyed by the locals sometime after 1950.

See also
 List of archaeological sites and monuments in Balochistan

References

Zhob District
Archaeological sites in Balochistan, Pakistan